Lôn Goed, also known as Y Lôn Goed, is a rural lane in Eifionydd, Gwynedd, Wales. Many Welsh writers have referred to it, including the poet R. Williams Parry. It is named after the two rows of trees either side of the lane.

Lôn Goed starts in the hamlet of Afon Wen, on the A497 main road about half a mile to the south of Chwilog and half-way between Cricieth and Pwllheli. Afon Wen lies on a river of the same name, near where it reaches the sea. The lane was created between 1819 and 1828 in order to promote the carriage of limestone and peat. It runs for about five miles, at first north-east then in a northerly direction, from Afon Wen to Hendre Cennin (Mynydd y Cennin). 

It is also referred to locally as "Lôn Môn", a corruption of the name Maughan.

In his poem 'Eifionydd', R. Williams Parry praises the beauty and "perfect peace" of Lôn Goed, contrasting it with the "ugliness of Gain." The writer from Eifionydd, J. G. Williams refers to it in his work too, e.g. in his book Pigau'r Sêr.

References 

Transport in Gwynedd
Welsh-language literature
Recreational walks in Wales